The 1944 Summer Olympics, which were to be officially known as the Games of the XIII Olympiad, were cancelled because of  World War II. They would have been held in London, England, United Kingdom, which won the bid on the first ballot in a June 1939 IOC election over Rome, Detroit, Lausanne, Athens, Budapest, Helsinki and Montreal. The selection was made at the 38th IOC Session in London in 1939.

History

Because of the cancellation, London went on to host the 1948 Summer Olympics.

In spite of the war, the IOC organised many events to celebrate the fiftieth anniversary of its foundation at its headquarters in Lausanne, Switzerland. Held from 17 to 19 June 1944, this celebration was referred to as "The Jubilee Celebrations of IOC" by Carl Diem, the originator of the modern tradition of the Olympic torch relay.

Polish Prisoners of War (POWs) in the Woldenberg (Dobiegniew) Oflag II-C POW camp were granted permission by their German captors to stage an unofficial POW Olympics during 23 July to 13 August 1944, and an Olympic Flag made with a bed sheet and pieces of coloured scarves was raised. The event has been considered to be a demonstration of the Olympic spirit transcending war.

Bid results

See also

Notes

 
Cancelled Olympic Games
Events cancelled due to World War II
1944 in multi-sport events
Summer Olympics by year